Osmar is a given name. Notable people with the name include:

Osmar Aparecido de Azevedo (born 1980), Brazilian striker
Osmar Coelho Claudiano  (born 1982), Brazilian right back
Osmar Donizete Cândido (born 1968), Brazilian football player
Osmar dos Santos (born 1968), Brazilian middle-distance runner who competes mostly over 800 metres
Osmar Ferreira Júnior (born 1987), Brazilian football striker
Osmar Ferreyra (born 1983), Argentine football midfielder
Osmar Mares (born 1987), Mexican footballer currently playing for Santos Laguna
Osmar Molinas, (born 1985), football midfielder from Paraguay
Osmar Núñez, Argentine drama and short film actor
Osmar Sigueira (born 1988), Brazilian football player
Osmar Ibáñez (born 1988), Spanish football player
Osmar R. Zaiane (born 1965), German computer scientist

Places
Osmar, Bulgaria, village in Veliki Preslav Municipality, Shumen Province

Others
Osmar: The Heel of the Loaf, a Brazilian animated television series